Jesus Andrés West Salazar (born 19 June 1999) is a Panamanian footballer currently playing as a defender for Costa del Este.

Career statistics

Club

Notes

References

External links 
 

1999 births
Living people
Panamanian footballers
Panamanian expatriate footballers
Panamanian expatriate sportspeople in Canada
Association football defenders
Expatriate soccer players in Canada
Toronto FC II players
USL League One players
Sportspeople from Panama City
Liga Panameña de Fútbol players
Panama under-20 international footballers